Maria Danielsson  (born 28 July 1981) is a Swedish snowboarder.

She was born in Leksand. She competed at the 2006 Winter Olympics, in snowboard cross.

References

External links 
 

1981 births
Living people
People from Leksand Municipality
Swedish female snowboarders
Olympic snowboarders of Sweden
Snowboarders at the 2006 Winter Olympics
Sportspeople from Dalarna County
21st-century Swedish women